The Burroughs Range is in the Catskill Mountains of New York southeast of West Shokan. It consists of Cornell Mountain, Slide Mountain, the highest peak in the Catskills, and Wittenberg Mountain. The  range was named for John Burroughs, a nature essayist whose forte was the observation of nature with accompanying poetical or philosophical commentary. Romer Mountain is located northeast and Friday Mountain is located south of Burroughs Range.

References

Mountains of Ulster County, New York
Mountains of New York (state)
Mountain ranges of New York (state)